Kanjikode or Kanchikode is an industrial town located  east of Palakkad. Kanjikode is the second largest industrial hub in Kerala after Kochi. The town is part of Pudussery Panchayat. It is one of the growing suburbs of Palakkad city. First and the only Indian Institute of Technology in Kerala, Indian Institute of Technology,Palakkad was established in  Kanjikode.

Location

Economy
Kanjikode is one of the largest industrial areas in Kerala and companies like Indian Telephone Industries Limited (ITI), Instrumentation Limited, Fluid Control Research Institute, Saint-Gobain India Private Limited (formerly SEPR Refractories India Private Limited), Patspin India Ltd, Pepsi, PPS steel (Kerela) Pvt Ltd, United breweries, Empee Distilleries, Marico, Bharat Earth Movers Limited (BEML), Rubfila International Ltd, Arya Vaidya Pharmacy have production facilities. Schools like Holy Trinity, Kendriya Vidyalaya School and a fire station are situated here.There are also many other industries and manufacturing units making it second largest industrial area after Kochi.

Education 
 Indian Institute of Technology Palakkad
 Kendriya Vidyalaya, Kanjikode
 V V College of Science and Technology
 Ahalia Edu-Health Campus, Palakkad
 Chathamkulam MBA College - CBS

Access
A railway coach factory and an Indian Institutes of Technology are upcoming in Kanjikode. The Walayar checkpost is situated nearby. There is a Railway station situated here where local trains only stops. Frequently there are KSRTC bus services from Palakkad to Coimbatore and local bus services from Palakkad to Walayar which are passing by Kanjikode. There are also bus routes to Malampuzha and Chittur from here. Petrol pumps, automated teller machines, restaurants and rooms are available. Kanjikode belongs to Malampuzha Legislative assembly and Palakkad (Lok Sabha constituency).

Kanjikode town connects to other parts of India through Palakkad city.  National Highway 544 connects to Coimbatore and Bangalore.  Other parts of Kerala is accessed through National Highway 966 The nearest major railway station is Palakkad Jn.  The nearest airport is Coimbatore.

See also
 Palakkad
 Palakkad South
 Pudussery Central
 Pudussery West

References

Cities and towns in Palakkad district
Suburbs of Palakkad